Paroaria, the red-headed cardinals or cardinal-tanagers (as they are not close to the Cardinalidae), are a genus of  tanagers. They were until recently placed in the family Emberizidae.

Five or six species are placed here. They are all very similar-looking birds, with heads resembling that of a northern cardinal (Cardinalis cardinalis, a true member of the Cardinalidae), though they are somewhat more slender, in particular the rather tanager-like bill.

Their coloration is also typical; they are quite unlike any Cardinalidae, though they bear a passing resemblance to adult male rose-breasted grosbeak (Pheucticus ludovicianus). Like these, they are white below and dark above (grey to blackish in the case of Paroaria). But unlike P. ludovicianus, they have no conspicuous pattern except for the head, which has large amounts of bright red; it may be predominantly so or patterned red-and-black. Almost all Paroaria have at least a short crest. The bill is yellowish below or in its entirety.

Taxonomy and species list
The genus Paroaria was introduced in 1832 by the French naturalist Charles Lucien Bonaparte with the red-crested cardinal as the type species. The name is from Tiéguacú paroára, a name for a small yellow, red and grey bird in the extinct Tupi language.

The genus contains six species:

References

 
Bird genera
Taxa named by Charles Lucien Bonaparte